KDYW, virtual channel 34 (UHF digital channel 20), was a non-commercial educational television station licensed to Waco, Texas, United States. The station was owned by the Brazos Valley Broadcasting Foundation. As KCTF and KWBU-TV, it operated as a PBS member station for much of its on-air history, but was slated to be sold to Community Television Educators of Waco, Inc., a group associated with the Daystar Television Network, before surrendering its license.

History

The station began in 1978, when Central Texas College's KNCT set up a low-powered translator on channel 34 in Waco, as a way to bring PBS programming to the city. Until then, cable systems in the area piped in both KNCT and KERA-TV in Dallas. After a long effort to bring a local PBS station to Waco, on May 22, 1989, it was upgraded to a full-powered station, KCTF, with the ability to produce local programming. That station replaced KNCT on cable systems in and around Waco. In 1994, Central Texas College transferred control of KCTF to the Brazos Valley Broadcasting Foundation, a community group formed a year earlier. In 1999, Baylor University took control of the foundation, changing the call letters to KWBU-TV in 2000. Also in 2000, the station acquired a radio sister when KWBU-FM signed on.

In 2003, KWBU activated its digital signal on channel 20, becoming the first Central Texas station to air a digital signal.

KWBU's analog transmitter was damaged in late January 2009. With the impending shutdown of analog broadcasting in the United States, the station opted to shut off its analog broadcasts and air solely in digital on February 3—two weeks before the other major stations in Central Texas went digital-only. However, through PSIP, the station's signal remapped to its former analog channel 34.

In the Waco area, it aired on cable channel 4 on Time Warner Cable and Grande Communications.

KWBU-TV's digital signal offered the following subchannels:

Funding problems and shutdown
Due to funding problems, KWBU-TV ceased local programming at the end of May 2010, resulting in some PBS programming, as well as all syndicated shows, disappearing from the schedule. The station became a pass-through for the national PBS feed until the end of June, when the station was reduced to a skeleton crew and all PBS programming was discontinued. Create, which had previously aired on the station's second digital subcarrier, would be broadcast on the main channel as well in its last month. After June 30, KNCT took over KWBU's cable slots on Time Warner and Grande channel 4, and became available on DirecTV. KWBU went off the air entirely at 11:59 p.m. CT on July 31, 2010.

The move came after KWBU-TV and KWBU-FM were unable to secure more funding from Baylor after exhausting a $1 million line of credit. For most of their history, the stations had suffered from low community support. Although Baylor, then as now, had controlling interest in the Brazos Valley Broadcasting Foundation, the KWBU stations were still technically community licensees. However, the partnership with Baylor, as well as the stations' callsigns, led to the perception that they were "Baylor stations" and rich with school funding, thus cutting into the community support needed to keep the station on the air. KWBU TV and FM's membership group only had 1,600 members, a very low number even as Waco went through a boom, and far lower than what station officials needed to keep channel 34 on the air.

KWBU-FM was deemed less expensive to operate and remains on the air today; its operating budget was half that of its television sister.

Attempted sale to Daystar
On May 31, 2011, the callsign for KWBU was changed to KDYW; however, it was not until August 2011 that the party buying the station was revealed - "Community Television Educators of Waco Inc.", a group headed by Marcus Lamb, the head of the Dallas-based Daystar network, which owns the organization. The station was acquired by the group for $250,000. In paperwork filed by the purchasers, the owners planned to use the station to broadcast local, educational, ethnic and socially-relevant programming, in addition to the programming currently offered by Daystar.

In the meantime, KDYW temporarily resumed operations from July 15 to August 5, 2011. On March 13, 2012, the Federal Communications Commission (FCC) raised questions as to whether Daystar, through associated nonprofit companies, was qualified to purchase KDYW and another former PBS outlet, WMFE-TV in Orlando, Florida.  Specifically, the FCC questioned whether the nonprofits listed as the prospective owners of WMFE and KDYW were actually shell companies for Daystar, and also doubted whether the stations would air enough educational programming to meet the conditions for the stations' noncommercial licenses, especially after Daystar was fined previously in 2008 for allowing a call to action in their programming on Daystar's non-commercial educational stations, which was against the FCC's non-commercial station underwriting spot guidelines.

The WMFE deal was canceled two days later (it has since been resold and has returned to PBS as WUCF-TV); on September 7, 2012, the Brazos Valley Broadcasting Foundation informed the FCC that it would request the dismissal of the license assignment application and return the KDYW license to the FCC.  Per the foundation's request, the FCC canceled the channel 34 license on September 27.

References

Defunct television stations in the United States
Television channels and stations established in 1989
1989 establishments in Texas
Television channels and stations disestablished in 2010
2010 disestablishments in Texas
DYW
Baylor University
DYW